Albert Jackson Pearson (May 20, 1846 – May 15, 1905) was a soldier, attorney, judge, and two-term U.S. Representative from Ohio from 1891 to 1895. He was a veteran of the Civil War.

Biography
Born in Centerville, Ohio, Pearson moved with his parents to Beallsville, Ohio at an early age. He attended the common schools and the normal school at Lebanon, Ohio.

Pearson served as a private in Company I, One Hundred and Eighty-Sixth Regiment, Ohio Volunteer Infantry, during the Civil War.

He was admitted to the bar in 1868 and commenced practice in Woodsfield, Ohio. He served as the prosecuting attorney of Monroe County, Ohio, from 1871 to 1877. He served as member of the Ohio Senate in 1881 and 1882. He was a probate judge of Monroe County from 1884 to 1890.

Congress
Pearson was elected as a Democrat to the Fifty-second and Fifty-third Congresses (March 4, 1891 - March 3, 1895). He was not a candidate for reelection in 1894 to the Fifty-fourth Congress, and instead resumed the practice of his profession.

Death
Pearson died in Woodsfield on May 15, 1905, and was interred in Woodsfield Cemetery.

References
 Retrieved on 2008-09-27

1846 births
1905 deaths
People from Centerville, Ohio
People from Beallsville, Ohio
Union Army soldiers
Ohio lawyers
Ohio state court judges
Democratic Party Ohio state senators
People of Ohio in the American Civil War
National Normal University alumni
County district attorneys in Ohio
19th-century American politicians
People from Woodsfield, Ohio
19th-century American judges
Democratic Party members of the United States House of Representatives from Ohio